Viktor Filutás (born 28 September 1996) is a Hungarian racing cyclist, who currently rides for UCI Continental team . He rode in the men's points race at the 2020 UCI Track Cycling World Championships.

Major results

2015
 1st  Time trial, National Under-23 Road Championships
2016
 National Under-23 Road Championships
2nd Time trial
3rd Road race
2017
 1st  Time trial, National Under-23 Road Championships
 7th Overall Gemenc Grand Prix
2019
 4th Gemenc Grand Prix II 
 6th Overall Tour of Szeklerland
2020
 National Road Championships
1st  Road race
4th Time trial
 4th Overall Tour of Romania
2021
 1st  Road race, National Road Championships
 3rd Visegrad 4 Kerekparverseny

References

External links

1996 births
Living people
Hungarian male cyclists
Hungarian track cyclists
Cyclists from Budapest